Wenamu River (Venamo River) is a river in South America. It forms a portion of the international boundary between Venezuela and Guyana. It is part of the Essequibo River basin.

Mango Landing is a small settlement on the Guyana side of the Wanamu River. Other settlements include Arau and Kaikan village. There is an airstrip that mostly serves miners working in the area.

The Wenamu has been a part of the long territorial dispute between Guyana and Venezuela. In 2007, Venezuelan troops used C-4 (explosive) to destroy mining dredges illegally in their territory. The Wenamu is also a crossing point for Venezuelan refugees entering Guyana.

See also
List of rivers of Venezuela
Mount Venamo
Ankoko Island

References

Rivers of Venezuela
Rivers of Guyana
International rivers of South America
Guyana–Venezuela border
Border rivers

Bibliography 

 Rand McNally, The New International Atlas, 1993.